In mathematics, in the area of classical potential theory, polar sets are the "negligible sets", similar to the way in which sets of measure zero are the negligible sets in measure theory.

Definition 

 on  

such that 

Properties 

The most important properties of polar sets are:

The union of a countable collection of polar sets is polar.
A polar set has Lebesgue measure zero in

Nearly everywhere
A property holds nearly everywhere in a set S if it holds on S−E where E is a Borel polar set.  If P holds nearly everywhere then it holds almost everywhere.

See also
 Pluripolar set

References

External links
 

Subharmonic functions